The 2023 Davis Cup qualifying round was held from 3 to 5 February 2023. The twelve winners of this round qualified for the 2023 Davis Cup Finals while the twelve losers qualified for the 2023 Davis Cup World Group I.

Teams
Twenty-four teams will play for twelve spots in the finals, in series decided on a home and away basis.

These twenty-four teams are:
 12 teams ranked 3rd–16th in the 2022 Finals except the 2 wild card teams
 12 winning teams from the 2022 World Group I

The 12 winning teams from the qualifying round will play at the Finals and the 12 losing teams will play at the World Group I.

#: Nations Ranking as of 28 November 2022.

Qualified teams

Seeded teams
  (#1)
  (#3)
  (#5)
  (#6)
  (#9)
  (#10)
  (#11)
  (#12)
  (#13)
  (#14)
  (#15)
  (#17)

Unseeded teams
  (#18)
  (#19)
  (#21)
  (#22)
  (#24)
  (#27)
  (#28)
  (#29)
  (#30)
  (#31)
  (#33)
  (#40)

Results summary

Results

Croatia vs. Austria

Hungary vs. France

Uzbekistan vs. United States

Germany vs. Switzerland

Colombia vs. Great Britain

Norway vs. Serbia

Chile vs. Kazakhstan

South Korea vs. Belgium

Sweden vs. Bosnia and Herzegovina

Netherlands vs. Slovakia

Finland vs. Argentina

Portugal vs. Czech Republic

References

External links
Draw

World Group
Davis Cup
Davis Cup
Davis Cup